Better Than Working is an autobiography or memoir written by Patrick Skene Catling, first published in 1960. It describes Catling's work in journalism and his love life.

References 

British memoirs
1960 non-fiction books
Books about journalism